Gradski Stadion is a football stadium in Laktaši, Bosnia and Herzegovina.  It is the home stadium of FK Laktaši of the Premier League of Bosnia and Herzegovina.  The stadium holds 5,000 spectators.

References 

Football venues in Bosnia and Herzegovina
Buildings and structures in Republika Srpska
FK Laktaši